Christina Marie Marañon de los Reyes (born 28 February 1994) is a Filipino footballer who has played for the Philippines women's national team.

College career
De los Reyes played for the UP Lady Booters of the University of the Philippines Diliman. The team participates in the UAAP and the PFF Women's League. She helped UP reach the UAAP finals twice.

UP lost to Far Eastern University in the UAAP Season 77 finals. The following season, UP had more success, clinching their first ever women's football title. De los Reyes scored one of the two goals in UP's 2–1 win against De La Salle University, in the UAAP Season 78 final in 2016.

International career
De los Reyes has played Philippines women's national team. At the 2014 AFC Women's Asian Cup qualifiers in Bangladesh in May 2013 she scored a goal in the Philippines' 4–0 win over the host. She also played at the 2016 AFF Championship.

International goals

References

1994 births
Living people
Filipino women's footballers
Philippines women's international footballers
Place of birth missing (living people)
Women's association football midfielders
University of the Philippines alumni
University Athletic Association of the Philippines footballers